Eivind Ellingsen is a Norwegian handball player.

He made his debut on the Norwegian national team in 2000, and played 70 matches for the national team between 2000 and 2007. He competed at the 2001 World Men's Handball Championship.

References

Year of birth missing (living people)
Living people
Norwegian male handball players